Lukáš Pék (born September 2, 1987) is a Slovak former professional ice hockey player who played with HC Slovan Bratislava in the Slovak Extraliga.

References

Living people
HC Slovan Bratislava players
Slovak ice hockey left wingers
1987 births
Ice hockey people from Bratislava
Bratislava Capitals players
Scorpions de Mulhouse players
Bisons de Neuilly-sur-Marne players
HK Trnava players
Slovak expatriate ice hockey players in the Czech Republic
Slovak expatriate sportspeople in Germany
Slovak expatriate sportspeople in Latvia
Slovak expatriate sportspeople in France
Expatriate ice hockey players in Germany
Expatriate ice hockey players in France
Expatriate ice hockey players in Latvia